Azriel Chaikin (Hebrew עזריאל חייקין ; born USSR, 1938) is a Brussels-based leader of the Chabad movement of Judaism in Ukraine. In 2003, he was proclaimed chief Chabad Rabbi of Chabad emissaries in Ukraine  .

Life 

Chaikin was born in the Georgian Soviet Socialist Republic in 1931, where his father, Meri Chaim Chaikin, had served as an envoy of the sixth Rebbe, Rabbi Yosef Yitzchak Schneersohn, who was known as the “Frierdiker” or “previous” rebbe. 

In 1955 Chaikin went on shlichus to Morocco and was the head of the Chabad Yeshiva in Agadir. Because the language taught in the schools under his auspices was Hebrew, he was accused of being a Zionist, and therefore left Morocco and moved to France. From France he moved to Denmark where he established a Chabad yeshiva.

In 1968 Rabbi Chaikin was offered a prestigious rabbinic position in Brussels, Belgium which he accepted. Because of this position he became an influential rabbinic figure in Europe.

He later on received the position of chief Rabbi of Ukraine which he attained until 2008. he asked Rabbi Jonathan Markovitch to take his position. Afterwards he moved to the Crown Heights area of Brooklyn.

References

External links
 https://web.archive.org/web/20120705103824/http://fradive.webs.ull.es/confe/heid2009/kashrut1.jpg

1938 births
Chabad-Lubavitch rabbis
Living people
Ukrainian Orthodox rabbis
chief rabbis